Ketchin Building, also known as the Fairfield County Historical Museum, is a historic building located at Winnsboro, Fairfield County, South Carolina.  It was built about 1830, and is a three-story, five bay, Federal style brick building with a hipped roof.  Originally built as a dwelling, it was sold in 1852 and was used as a school for girls until closed by the American Civil War.

It was added to the National Register of Historic Places in 1971.

References

External links
Fairfield County Chapter of the South Carolina Genealogical Society

Commercial buildings on the National Register of Historic Places in South Carolina
Federal architecture in South Carolina
Commercial buildings completed in 1852
Buildings and structures in Fairfield County, South Carolina
National Register of Historic Places in Fairfield County, South Carolina
1830 establishments in South Carolina